Thimbirigolla Grama Niladhari Division is a Grama Niladhari Division of the Damana Divisional Secretariat  of Ampara District  of Eastern Province, Sri Lanka .  It has Grama Niladhari Division Code W/24C.

Thimbirigolla is a surrounded by the Wadinagala, Ambalanoya, Ekgaloya, Kumana, Madana, Pannalgama, Madawalalanda and Thottama  Grama Niladhari Divisions.

Demographics

Ethnicity 

The Thimbirigolla Grama Niladhari Division has a Sinhalese majority (99.9%) . In comparison, the Damana Divisional Secretariat (which contains the Thimbirigolla Grama Niladhari Division) has a Sinhalese majority (99.5%)

Religion 

The Thimbirigolla Grama Niladhari Division has a Buddhist majority (99.8%) . In comparison, the Damana Divisional Secretariat (which contains the Thimbirigolla Grama Niladhari Division) has a Buddhist majority (99.0%)

Grama Niladhari Divisions of Damana Divisional Secretariat

References